Nudžein Geca (born 10 May 1966) is a retired Bosnian-Herzegovinian and Yugoslav professional footballer.

Club career
Geca started his senior professional career as a 16 year old with Radnički Goražde. In the summer of 1988 he was transferred to Yugoslav First League side FK Sarajevo, whom he represented until 1995. He further played for Bosna Visoko and Željezničar, before retiring in 2003.

International career
He made his debut for Bosnia and Herzegovina in an October 1996 FIFA World Cup qualification match against Croatia and has earned a total of 6 caps, scoring no goals. His final international was a November 1997 friendly match against Tunisia.

References

External links
 

1966 births
Living people
Footballers from Sarajevo
Association football defenders
Yugoslav footballers
Bosnia and Herzegovina footballers
Bosnia and Herzegovina international footballers
FK Sarajevo players
NK Bosna Visoko players
FK Željezničar Sarajevo players
Yugoslav First League players
Premier League of Bosnia and Herzegovina players